SAM and SH3 domain-containing protein 1 is a protein that in humans is encoded by the SASH1 gene.

References

Further reading